Velakkaran is a 1953 Indian Malayalam-language film, directed by E. R. Cooper and produced by K. G. Sreedharan Nair. The film stars Thikkurissy Sukumaran Nair and P. K. Saraswathi. The film had musical score by V. Dakshinamoorthy.

Cast
 P. K. Saraswathi
 Pankajavalli
 S. P. Pillai
 Thikkurissy Sukumaran Nair
 Jagadamma
 K. G. Sreedharan Nair
 Sumathi
 Sasikumar
 Alleppey Shankar
 K. P. Kesavan
 Augustine Joseph

References

External links
 

1950s Malayalam-language films